Edythe Wright (August 16, 1916 – October 27, 1965) was an American singer who performed from 1935 to 1939 with the band led by Tommy Dorsey.

Early life
Wright grew up in Highland Park, New Jersey.

Early career 
Wright debuted on radio in March 1935, singing with Paul Whiteman's Rhythm Trio. That performance led to her becoming the singer in the Sunset Room of the Robert Treat Hotel in Newark, New Jersey. By the end of that month, she was also singing "7 to 10 presentations a week" on WOR radio. She sang with Frank Crum's orchestra in the Sunset Room and later performed with Lennie Hayton's orchestra. In May 1935, while singing with Crum's orchestra, she made six recordings for Brunswick Records.

Wright's early exposure on network radio came via appearances with the orchestras of Frank Dailey and Joe Haymes. She won the job with Dailey out of 500 women who auditioned, enabling her to be heard six nights a week on CBS. Her network debut came on August 31, 1935, when she sang with Dailey's orchestra from the Meadowbrook Ballroom in Cedar Grove, New Jersey.

Big Band era
Wright became the first female singer with Dorsey's band after he left the Dorsey Brothers Orchestra to start his own group. Her career spanned from September 1935 through August 1939.

Wright's acquaintance with an executive at Brown & Williamson tobacco company helped to secure a radio program for the Dorsey band. She was a fixture on radio (Jack Pearl Show).

Post-Dorsey era
After Wright left Dorsey's group, she had a solo singing act. In September 1940, she was joined by Ruth Lowe, forming a new act that debuted in Boston, Massachusetts. In 1943, she starred on Victory Caravan, a variety show on radio station WIP in Philadelphia, Pennsylvania.

Personal life 
She married John T. Smith. They had a son, Patrick.

Death 
Wright died at the Point Pleasant Hospital on October 27, 1965.

References

U.S. Census 1900, 1910, 1920, 1930
Rose Shiffman, "The Edythe Wright Story" AfterBeat Summer 1972
Peter Levinson, Tommy Dorsey: Livin' in a Great Big Way

External links
 Edythe Wright recordings at the Discography of American Historical Recordings.

1916 births
1965 deaths
New Brunswick High School alumni
People from Highland Park, New Jersey
People from Wall Township, New Jersey
Musicians from New Brunswick, New Jersey
Rutgers University alumni
American women jazz singers
American jazz singers
20th-century American singers
20th-century American women singers
New Jersey Democrats
American Roman Catholics